Sinanpaşa District is a district of Afyonkarahisar Province of Turkey. Its seat is the town Sinanpaşa. Its area is 889 km2, and its population is 38,830 (2021).

Composition
There are 11 municipalities in Sinanpaşa District:

 Ahmetpaşa
 Akören
 Düzağaç
 Güney
 Kılıçarslan
 Kırka
 Küçükhüyük
 Serban
 Sinanpaşa
 Taşoluk
 Tınaztepe

There are 24 villages in Sinanpaşa District:

 Akçaşar
 Akdeğirmen
 Ayvalı
 Balmahmut
 Başkimse
 Boyalı
 Bulca
 Çatkuyu
 Çayhisar
 Çobanözü
 Elvanpaşa
 Eyice
 Garipçe
 Gezler
 İğdeli
 Karacaören
 Kayadibi
 Kınık
 Nuh
 Saraycık
 Tazlar
 Tokuşlar
 Yıldırımkemal
 Yörükmezarı

References

External links
 District governor's official website 

Districts of Afyonkarahisar Province